2012–13 Deodhar Trophy was the 40th season of the Deodhar Trophy with the first being the 1973–74 season. It was a List A cricket tournament contested by five teams, North Zone, West Zone, South Zone, Central Zone, East Zone.

Schedule
The 2012–13 Deodhar Trophy comprised just four matches played between the teams, where the two teams thar performed the worst in the previous season of the Deodhar Trophy, East Zone and South Zone, need to play an additional knockout game to progress to the semifinals.

The schedule:
 1. 10 March – Quarterfinal – South Zone vs East Zone
 2. 11 March – Semifinal1 – Central Zone vs North Zone
 3. 12 March – Semifinal2 – West Zone vs Winner Quarterfinal
 4. 13 March – Final – Winner Semifinal1 vs Winner Semifinal2

Results

Quarterfinal

Semifinal 1

Semifinal 2

Final

References

External links

Deodhar Trophy
Deodhar Trophy